Tell Aalaq is an archaeological site 9km west of Baalbek in the Beqaa Mohafazat (Governorate). It dates at least to the early Bronze Age.

References

Baalbek District
Bronze Age sites in Lebanon
Archaeological sites in Lebanon
Great Rift Valley
Aalaq